The 26 municipalities of the Uusimaa Region in Finland are divided between four sub-regions:



Helsinki Sub-region 
Espoo (Esbo)
Helsinki (Helsingfors)
Hyvinkää (Hyvinge)
Järvenpää (Träskända)
Kauniainen (Grankulla)
Kerava (Kervo)
Kirkkonummi (Kyrkslätt)
Mäntsälä
Nurmijärvi
Pornainen (Borgnäs)
Sipoo (Sibbo)
Siuntio (Sjundeå)
Tuusula (Tusby)
Vantaa (Vanda)
Karkkila (Högfors)
Lohja (Lojo)
Vihti (Vichtis)

Raseborg Sub-region 

Hanko (Hangö)
Ingå (Inkoo)
Raseborg (Raasepori)

Loviisa Sub-region 
Lapinjärvi (Lappträsk)
Loviisa (Lovisa)

Porvoo Sub-region 
Askola
Myrskylä (Mörskom)
Pukkila
Porvoo (Borgå)

See also 
Southern Finland
Regions of Southern Finland

External links